Isona Passola i Vidal is a film producer, screenwriter and director from Barcelona. She is the current president of the Catalan Film Academy.

References

External links

Living people
Spanish film producers
People from Barcelona
Spanish women film directors
Film directors from Catalonia
Year of birth missing (living people)
Spanish women screenwriters
20th-century Spanish screenwriters
21st-century Spanish screenwriters